Osidda is a comune (municipality) in the Province of Nuoro in the Italian region Sardinia, located about  north of Cagliari and about  northwest of Nuoro.

Osidda borders the following municipalities: Bitti, Buddusò, Nule, Pattada.

References

Cities and towns in Sardinia